Chung Khiaw Bank Limited was a Singapore bank that was established by millionaire Aw Boon Haw and later became a subsidiary of United Overseas Bank after takeovers in 1971–72. Part of the shares of Chung Khiaw Bank was injected to a listed company Haw Par Brothers International in 1969 and was acquired by a domestic competitor United Overseas Bank (UOB) in 1971, after the parent company was takeover by Slater Walker. Chung Khiaw Bank merged with UOB in 1999.

The brand "Chung Khiaw Bank" was survived in nearby Malaysia as a subsidiary of UOB until 1997. In 1997, UOB (Malaysia) merged with Chung Khiaw Bank (Malaysia).

In 1971, Chung Khiaw Bank also have two branches in Hong Kong, which became the branches of UOB in 1999.

History
Chung Khiaw Bank was established as a family-held business on 59 Robinson Road, Singapore. The founding chairman of the bank was millionaire Aw Boon Haw, who famous for his "Star Newspapers", and "Tiger Balm"; after his death, Ko Teck Kin and then Aw Cheng Chye, nephew of Aw Boon Haw and son of Aw Boon Par succeed the position. However, the founding managing director / president of the bank, was Lee Chee Shan, husband of Aw Cheng Hu, the daughter of Aw Boon Par. It was reported that Lee himself was a blood relatives of Aw Boon Haw and Boon Par, according to Lee granddaughter's autobiography (distant relatives) and a book by the Institute of Southeast Asian Studies (first cousin once removed). Lee still served for the bank after the death of Aw Boon Haw.

In 1969, Aw Cheng Chye took most of the assets of family-held holding company Haw Par Brothers (Private) Limited public by the incorporation of Haw Par Brothers International and an initial public offering. The assets including equity stake of Chung Khiaw Bank. In June 1971, the listed company was takeover by Slater Walker. However, the 49.8% stake of Chung Khiaw Bank that was held by the listed company, was sold to domestic competitor United Overseas Bank (UOB) for S$22 million. Lee Chee Shan was retired from the position "lifetime president" in July 1971 with a retirement compensation of S$750,000. Before his retirement, his monthly salary was S$35,500. Lee Chee Shan was appointed as "lifetime president" from managing director circa 1 June 1971.

In 1972, a new logo for both UOB and Chung Khiaw Bank was launched. Some member of Aw family, such as Aw It Haw, remained as the director of Chung Khiaw Bank in January 1972, with the rest was related to UOB. Aw Cheng Chye also remained as the director until his death on 22 August 1971. A proposal to acquire the remaining stake of Chung Khiaw Bank by UOB by a share swap (1:1), was announced in June 1972. A minority shareholder made a public statement on the newspaper to against it, claiming the price was not favourable as well as the conflict of interest of the director from the related parties. Nevertheless, UOB acquired an additional 28.7% stake in mid-1973.

In 1974, a rumor that the bank's financial position was precarious caused a bank run in its Singapore branches. This was one of the reasons why deposit insurance was introduced in Singapore.

Chung Khiaw Bank finally became a wholly owned subsidiary of UOB in February 1988 by issuing 15,230,903 number of UOB new shares as payment for the remaining 17.13 million number of shares (17.1%) of Chung Khiaw Bank. At the time of acquisition, Aw It Haw was still a director of Chung Khiaw Bank.

In 1997, Malaysia branches was merged with UOB branches. In 1999, Chung Khiaw Bank was finally absorbed by UOB, became UOB branches.

Footnotes

References

Further reading
 
 

Defunct banks of Singapore
Defunct banks of Malaysia
Defunct banks of Hong Kong
Banks established in 1950
Banks disestablished in 1999
1950 establishments in Singapore
1999 disestablishments in Singapore
1997 disestablishments in Malaysia
1998 disestablishments in Hong Kong
Aw family
Family-owned companies of Singapore